The yellow-bellied flycatcher (Empidonax flaviventris) is a small insect-eating bird of the tyrant flycatcher family.

Description 
Adults have greenish upperparts and yellowish underparts (especially on the throat), with a dusky wash on the chest. They have a white or yellow eye ring that lacks the teardrop projection of Pacific-slope (E. difficilis) or cordilleran (E. occidentalis) flycatchers, white or yellowish wing bars that contrast strongly against the black wings, a broad, flat bill, and a relatively short tail when compared to other members of the genus. The upper mandible of the bill is dark, while the lower mandible is orange-pink. DNA testing in 2014 confirmed a field mark, involving the extent of buffy edging on the secondaries, to reliably distinguish this species from the two so-called "Western Flycatchers."

Measurements:

 Length: 
 Weight: 
 Wingspan: 

Yellow-bellied flycatchers wait on a perch low or in the middle of a tree and fly out to catch insects in flight, sometimes hovering over foliage. They sometimes eat berries or seeds.

The yellow-bellied flycatcher's song can be transcribed as a rough, descending "tse-berk", which can be similar to the more common least flycatcher's snappier, more evenly pitched "che-bek."

Breeding 
Their breeding habitat is wet northern woods, especially spruce bogs, across Canada and the northeastern United States. They make a cup nest in sphagnum moss on or near the ground.

Migration 
These birds migrate to southern Mexico and Central America.

References

External links

 Yellow-bellied Flycatcher Species Account - Cornell Lab of Ornithology
 Yellow-bellied Flycatcher - Empidonax flaviventris - USGS Patuxent Bird Identification InfoCenter
 Yellow-bellied Flycatcher, Environment Canada
 Yellow-bellied Flycatcher Canadian range, Canadian Biodiversity Web Site
 
 
 

yellow-bellied flycatcher
Birds of Canada
Native birds of the Northeastern United States
yellow-bellied flycatcher
yellow-bellied flycatcher